Aghel may refer to:
 Aghel Kamar
 Aghel Khvajeh
 Aghel Nazri